Plaksino is a rural locality in Kosteltsevsky Selsoviet Rural Settlement, Kurchatovsky District, Kursk Oblast, Russia. Population:

Geography 
The village is located on the Lomna River (a right tributary of the Seym), 69 km from the Russia–Ukraine border, 32 km west of Kursk, 9 km north-east of the district center – the town Kurchatov, 17 km from the selsoviet center – Kosteltsevo.

Climate 
Plaksino has a warm-summer humid continental climate (Dfb in the Köppen climate classification).

Transport 
Plaksino is located 23 km from the federal route  Crimea Highway, 6 km from the road of regional importance  (Kursk – Lgov – Rylsk – border with Ukraine), 1.5 km from the road of intermunicipal significance  (Seym River – Mosolovo – Nizhneye Soskovo), 2 km from the road  (38N-575 – Zolotukhino), 7,5 km from the nearest railway halt 433 km (railway line Lgov I — Kursk).

Plaksino is situated 38 km from Kursk Vostochny Airport, 132 km from Belgorod International Airport and 241 km from Voronezh Peter the Great Airport.

References

Notes

Sources

Rural localities in Kurchatovsky District, Kursk Oblast